The Eritrean records in swimming are the fastest ever performances of swimmers from Eritrea, which are recognised and ratified by the Eritrean National Swimming Federation.

All records were set in finals unless noted otherwise.

Long Course (50 m)

Men

Women

Short Course (25 m)

Men

Women

References

Eritrea
Records
Swimming
Swimming